Cychrus kaiseri is a species of ground beetle in the subfamily of Carabinae. It was described by Deuve in 2001 and named after Czech actor Oldřich Kaiser.

References

kaiseri
Beetles described in 2001